Berri–UQAM station is a Montreal Metro station in the borough of Ville-Marie, in Montreal, Quebec, Canada. It is operated by the Société de transport de Montréal (STM) and is the system's central station. This station is served by the Green, Orange, and Yellow lines. It is located in the Quartier Latin.

Berri–UQAM is the 2nd deepest station in the network, and also the busiest station in the network, transfers not included. If transfers were included, the 13 million passengers number would rise to about 35–40 million a year. It is the only subway station in Canada to have three lines servicing it.

Overview 

Designed by Longpré and Marchand, the station serves three lines: the Green, Orange, and Yellow Lines.

The main part of the station is a cruciform cut and cover volume built underneath the intersection of rue Berri and boulevard de Maisonneuve; the volume is so large that the station's design had to include massive pillars to support the street.

This central volume contains three levels. The upper level contains the rectangular mezzanine at its centre, with fare gates on all four sides; the arms extend out to the station's entrances, with two more entrances at the crossing, and are also lined with shops and services.

Staircases lead from the mezzanine to the landings on either side of the Orange Line. These landings provide views of the great volumes over the Green Line platforms below.

From the Green Line level, escalators and hallways connect the rest of the station to the Yellow Line terminus, built in a tunnel a block away under rue Saint-Denis, around 28 metres below the surface. Limited space in the yellow line tail tracks cause trains to reverse both in the tail tracks and in the foretracks when they leave the station.

All three lines have side platforms. The station was the first to be equipped with the MétroVision information screens, which displays news, commercials, and the time until the next train arrives.

In 2009, the station was made partially wheelchair-accessible through the addition of elevators. Two elevators connect the Orange Line platforms to the mezzanine. The Green Line platforms are accessible via two additional elevators as of November 2020. , the Yellow Line is not yet accessible - however construction is underway to provided elevators.

The mezzanine can be accessed from the street via elevators in the Grande Bibliothèque du Québec and UQAM's Pavillon Judith-Jasmin; but those buildings are closed during some of the Metro's operating hours. However, there is an elevator in the Saint-Denis exit, which opened in June 2010 and is open throughout the operating hours.

The station has 5 entrances:

 Entrance A: 1500, rue Berri
 Entrance B: 505, rue Sainte-Catherine Est
 Entrance C: 850, boul. de Maisonneuve Est
 Entrance D: 1470, rue Saint-Denis 
 1621, rue Berri (no letter assigned)

Station layout

Architecture and art 

The station has a total of four independent exits: three integrated into buildings (the Berri, Saint-Denis, and Place Dupuis exits) and one free-standing kiosk (the Sainte-Catherine exit). The station also contains several underground city connections, listed below.

The work of five artists is exhibited in this station. The largest work is a stained-glass mural by Pierre Gaboriau and Pierre Osterrath entitled Hommage aux fondateurs de la ville de Montréal (homage to the founders of the city of Montreal). A gift of the Union régionale de Montréal des caisses populaires Desjardins and installed in 1969, it depicts Jérôme le Royer de la Dauversière, Jeanne Mance, and Paul Chomedey, sieur de Maisonneuve. It is located over the eastern portal of the Green Line tunnel.

Three paintings by Robert LaPalme are located over the main staircase leading to the Yellow Line terminus. Originally located at the entrance to Expo 67, they represent three themes of the Expo: science, recreation, and culture.

A plaque by LaPalme and Georges Lauda, commemorating the inauguration of the Metro, is located at the centre of the mezzanine. It is enclosed in a black circular bench, a popular meeting site, referred to as la rondelle (the hockey puck) or la pilule (the pill) or "le banc des fous" (the crazy bench).

There is also a piece of work located in the newer Sainte-Catherine entrance pavilion, by architect Gaétan Pelletier. The work is a statue of Mother Émilie Gamelin by Raoul Hunter, commemorating Place Émilie-Gamelin (also called Berri Square) in which the entrance is located. The statue is owned by the City of Montreal.

The most recent art piece put in place inside the station is the Wall of Peace on the concourse level of the Yellow Line. It consists of coloured metal plates bearing the word "peace" in multiple languages.

History
Berri-UQAM was the site of the Metro's inauguration on October 14, 1966.

On September 2, 2001, a canister of tear gas was set off inside the station, forcing the evacuation of the 300 passengers inside.

Origin of the name
Berri–UQAM is named for both Berri Street, so called since 1663, and for the Université du Québec à Montréal. The university has taken to using UQAM as its abbreviation, which it displays as UQÀM (with a grave accent over the A as its logo; the station retains the UQAM form).

Until 1988, the station was named Berri-de-Montigny; rue de Montigny is the former name of boulevard de Maisonneuve in this area.

Small stubs of de Montigny street still survive in Downtown Montreal between Saint Laurent Boulevard and Saint Urbain Street and in the Montréal-Est suburb.

Station improvements 
In 2009, the station was made partially wheelchair-accessible, with two elevators connecting the Orange Line platforms to the mezzanine. From August 2010 to mid-2017, the station underwent $90 million of renovations that changed the appearance of the station and secured the tunnels and the roofs. Other work that was done included mechanical, structural, and architectural improvements.

The first phase lasted from August 2010 to the summer of 2011 and included the removal of the gray tiles on all 3 platforms and station walls. Temporary walls were put up until the next phase.

The second phase began in January 2012 and continued until June 2012. It included reinforcing walls; renovating mechanical, structural, and architectural components, and removing four red columns on the mezzanine level staircases. Once that was completed, the temporary walls and finishes were removed and replaced by new permanent architectural facings.

In early 2013, the STM refurbished the station's main electrical conduits and therefore had to shut down several escalators. In the same year, the Berri and Place Dupuis entrance buildings have been renovated, with new structural slab, ceilings, light fixtures, floor coverings and granite stairs.

From fall 2013 to fall 2014, part of the waterproofing membrane under Berri has been replaced. In 2015. the Yellow line area has been refurbished, with new wall finishes and floor coverings, as well as improved lighting. The tunnel ceiling and walkway over the tracks have been also revamped.

In 2016, the Saint-Denis entrance building has been refurbished, and a few corridors to the Orange and Green line platforms have been rearranged. The staircase between the two levels has been refurbished.

The Green line platforms are accessible as of November 2020. , construction to provide elevators to the Yellow Line is underway, despite the technical challenge of excavating and building new elevators 28 metres below street level.

Connecting bus routes

Société de transport de Montréal

Other connecting bus routes 
 See  Gare d'autocars de Montréal

Nearby points of interest

Connected via the underground city 
Université du Québec à Montréal
 Gare d'autocars de Montréal
Grande Bibliothèque

Other

Quartier Latin
Cégep du Vieux Montréal
Hôpital Saint-Luc du CHUM

Cinémathèque québécoise
National Film Board of Canada
Place Émilie-Gamelin ("Berri Square")

Théâtre Saint-Denis
Cinéma du Quartier-Latin
Service Canada
 Métropolis

References

External links

 Société de transport de Montréal - official web page of the station
 Berri-UQAM metro station geo location
 Montreal by Metro, metrodemontreal.com - photos, information, and trivia
 2011 STM System Map
 2011 Downtown System Map
 Metro Map

Accessible Montreal Metro stations
Green Line (Montreal Metro)
Orange Line (Montreal Metro)
Yellow Line (Montreal Metro)
Railway stations in Canada opened in 1966
Railway stations in Canada at university and college campuses
Quartier Latin, Montreal
Centre-Sud